UDPGT may refer to:
 Glucuronosyltransferase, an enzyme
 UDP glucuronosyltransferase 1 family, polypeptide A1, an enzyme